Grayce Hampton (28 March 1876 – 20 December 1963) was a British film and stage actress. Her name was often seen as Grace Hampton.

Hampton studied at a convent in Brussels, and a teacher there introduced her to Augustus Harris, who arranged for her to perform in one of his productions. After that, she acted in other Harris productions at the Drury Lane Theater in London.

Hampton emigrated to the United States with Henry Irving's production of Robespierre. She found work on Broadway and then in Hollywood as a film actress in generally character roles such as the 1932 comedy The Unexpected Father.

Broadway plays in which Hampton appeared included Suspect (1940), Point Valaine (1935), Her Majesty the Widow (1934), Gentlemen Prefer Blondes (1926), Easy Virtue (1925), Antony and Cleopatra (1924), Pelleas and Melisande (1923), Romeo and Juliet (1923), Malvaloca (1922), and Fall and Rise of Susan Lenox (1920).

Hampton performed in vaudeville with Otis Skinner.

Hampton was married to English comedian Charles Dodsworth.

Filmography

References

External links
 

1876 births
1963 deaths
20th-century British actresses
20th-century English people
20th-century English women
Actresses from Devon
British emigrants to the United States
British film actresses
British stage actresses
Vaudeville performers